Melilotus elegans, the elegant sweetclover, is a species of annual herb in the family Fabaceae. They have a self-supporting growth form. Individuals can grow to 0.39 m.

Sources

References 

Trifolieae